Alexandre Teixeira, also known as Tigrão Big Tiger (Born in Rio de Janeiro) is a Brazilian rapper. Throughout his career, he recorded several songs with fellow Brazilian rapper Speedfreaks.

Biography
In 1996, Big Tiger started out his music career when he formed his first Rap group called Discriminados do Rap, in collaboration with Marcelo Texeira. While in 1998, he was invited to form the group Ciência Rimática with Facão and DJ Mohamed at Zueira Hip Hop. The group lasted until 2004, at which time Tigrão Big Tiger began to attend various freestyle sessions and Hip Hop events.

In 2005, he formed Aliança 21 with Mahal and DJ Arra, and later DJ Erick Scratch joined them. At the time, they released an album called Apocalipse. The group lasted from 2005 to 2009, and in the meantime Tigrão was invited to provide back vocals on Black Alien's album Babylon By Gus. Later Tigrão was invited to form a partnership with Speedfreaks, as a result he recorded two songs and released two video clips entitled Niterói São Gonçalo and Trocando Idéia, respectively. In 2008, Tigrão recorded various unreleased songs with Speedfreaks in São Paulo, before Speedfreaks passed away in 2010.

Big Tiger released his first solo album called Evolução with DJ and Beatmaker Guilla Beatmático. The album was heavily played in important events such as Liga dos MC's, Batalha do Real, Porão Hip Hop, Hip Hop Circo Voador, Cufa Aracaju Sergipe, Westcost Lapa,
Tourbillon, Peripheral Movement at SESC Niterói, Hip Hop Station, among others.

Big Tiger has already opened for important artists and groups such as: Planet Hemp, Thaide SP, Luiz Melodia, Nação Zumbi, Black Alien, GOG from Brasília, Mv Bill, Banda Naya with Andrew Tosh at Fundição Progresso, among others. Big Tiger's influences come from Rio de Janeiro's Underground Hip Hop scene, where he initiated his Rap career and joined the music industry. He is known to be an activist and fights for equal rights.

In 2022, Tigrão Big Tiger released his second solo album called "Paz de Espírito", which contains features by rappers such as De Leve and Mahal. The production on "Paz de Espírito" was handled by Emtee, Debug, Guillabeamatico and Renato Musash.

Discography

Studio albums
 Evolução (2005)
 Paz de Espírito (2022)

Videoclipes
2005 - Correria
2008 - São Gonçalo/Niterói (with Speedfreaks)
2009 - Trocando Ideia (with Speedfreaks)
2018 - Meus Pensamentos (with De Leve)

Singles

References

External links
 PMSG RJ: https://servicos.pmsg.rj.gov.br/imprime.php?cod=5663

Brazilian rappers
Musicians from Rio de Janeiro (city)
Living people
Year of birth missing (living people)